Calvary Hospital is a Catholic not-for-profit private hospital, located in Lenah Valley, Hobart, Tasmania. It was founded by the Sisters of the Little Company of Mary in 1899, at the St. John's campus.

Calvary provides specialised treatment in the areas of orthopaedic surgery, urology, gynaecology, neurosurgery, paediatric surgery, plastic surgery, vascular surgery, cardiology, respiratory medicine, gastroenterology, obstetrics, general medicine, critical care medicine, and pain management by specialist anaesthetists.

There are four Calvary Health Care Tasmania campuses at:
 Lenah Valley Campus - Lenah Valley (opened 1938)
 St John's Campus - South Hobart (opened 1899)
 St Luke's Campus - Launceston (acquired in 2004)
 St Vincent's Campus - Launceston (acquired in 2005)

References

External links
 

Catholic hospitals in Oceania
Hospitals in Hobart
Hospitals established in 1899
1899 establishments in Australia